Adachi Kagemori (安達 景盛) (died 1248) was a Japanese warrior. He was part of the Adachi clan, and then he joined the Hojo clan.

References 

Japanese warrior monks
1248 deaths
Adachi clan
Year of birth unknown